The Hellmilton Roller Ghouls are a Roller Derby league located in the central North Island of New Zealand.

Independently run by its members, the Hellmilton Roller Ghouls currently have one team for 2015, Raggedy Angst.

History
"Caught in the worldwide whirlwind of roller derby was Miss Metal Militia, who began her training in Vancouver, Canada with Terminal City Rollergirls, after skating artistically as a child. Upon her return to Hamilton, New Zealand, she decided to start a league at home."

For the past five years the Hellmilton Roller Ghouls have hosted representatives from leagues all over New Zealand at the annual International Tattoo and Art Expo. The Hellmilton Roller Ghouls hosted their first bout in 2011, inviting teams from Mount Militia Derby Crew (Mount Maunganui), Taranaki Roller Corps (Taranaki region), and Pirate City Rollers. Later the same year, three women from Hellmilton Roller Ghouls were selected as part of Team New Zealand (Roller Derby Team New Zealand). Together they travelled to compete in the 2011 Roller Derby World Cup held in Toronto, Ontario, Canada. These players were Miss Metal Militia, Poison Petal, and Boom Shakalaka. Team New Zealand placed 8th out of 13 teams.
In 2014 Hellmilton Roller Ghouls also had two skaters selected to play in the most recent Roller Derby World Cup in Dallas, Texas; Miss Metal Militia and Miss Crunchbull.  Team NZ is now ranked 5th out of 30 teams worldwide, with help from these ladies.

Raggedy Angst
Raggedy Angst is the Hellmilton Roller Ghouls' travel team, chosen after try-outs at the beginning of every year. This team competes against other teams around New Zealand, travelling as well as hosting bouts.
Raggedy Angst's team colours are black and orange.

2016 results

2015 results

2014 results

2013 results

2012 results

2011 results

2010 results

National Tournament, 'Roller Derby Royal' hosted by Swamp City, October 26-27, 2013

An overall placing of 11th (out of 16).

National Tournament, 'Roller Derby Royal' hosted by Swamp City, August 25, 2012

Home season
The Hellmilton Roller Ghouls completed their first home season in 2012 with their two home teams Gang'Green (Black & Green) and Ultra Violent (Purple & Silver). These two home teams play against each other at Melville Skate Rink.

Junior Monstar Squad
In July 2013 the Junior Monstar Squad was born, welcoming a younger generation of skaters into the midst of the Hellmilton Roller Ghouls. These members are of both genders and range from 14 to 17 years. They are split up into two groups; the Mogwais who are learning the skills and the Gremlins who are the official junior bouting team.

2015 results

References

Roller derby leagues in New Zealand